Romeo Aliac Brawner (September 17, 1935 – May 29, 2008) was a Filipino public official who served as a Commissioner of the Philippine Commission on Elections (COMELEC) from 2005 until his death from a heart attack in May 2008. From February to March 2008, he served as the Acting Chairman of the COMELEC, by virtue of his being the most senior Commissioner on the commission, replacing Resurreccion Borra on the February 2, 2008 after the latter had retired.

Brawner earned his law degree from the University of the Philippines College of Law in 1959. He entered the Philippine judiciary in 1975 as a trial court judge in Baguio. In 1995, he was appointed by President Fidel Ramos as a Justice of the Court of Appeals of the Philippines. In 2005, President Gloria Macapagal Arroyo appointed Brawner as Presiding Justice of the Court of Appeals. Immediately upon his retirement from the Court of Appeals, having reached the compulsory retirement age of 70, President Arroyo named Brawner as Commissioner of the COMELEC.

Prior to his appointment as a Baguio City Court judge and later, as Regional Trial Court Judge of Branch 10 in La Trinidad, Benguet (January 1987 to August 1995), he served as a public prosecutor for 11 years, and was also a professor of law at the Baguio Colleges Foundation (University of the Cordilleras), from 1971 to 1995. Also a native of Kiangan, Ifugao, he was a Bureau of Internal Revenue collection agent and a Knight of Columbus member. He was conferred the Chief Justice Jose Laurel Judicial Excellence Award as outstanding judge from the Foundation for Judicial Excellence in 1995.

Brawner grew up in Solano, Nueva Vizcaya.

Members of the Brawner Commission
Assumed office: February 2, 2008
Dissolved: March 25, 2008

See also
Commission on Elections (Philippines)

References

1935 births
2008 deaths
University of the Philippines alumni
20th-century Filipino judges
People from Nueva Vizcaya
Commissioners of constitutional commissions of the Philippines
Arroyo administration personnel
Justices of the Court of Appeals of the Philippines